This is a list of active and extinct (or non-active) volcanoes in Norway.

References 

Norway
Volcanoes